Jamario Thomas (born May 10, 1985)  is a former running back for the North Texas Mean Green. Thomas led the NCAA in rushing as a true freshman in 2004.

Early life
Thomas played high school football at Spring Hill High School in Longview, Texas.

College career

2004
Thomas posted his best statistical performances his freshman year.  In 2004, he was named Sun Belt Conference Player of the Year, Offensive Player of the Year and Freshman of the Year.  He led the nation in rushing yards, averaging 180.1 yards per game and ranked fifth in the nation for scoring, averaging 11.3 points per game.  He set both school and conference records with 1,801 yards for the season and set the NCAA freshman record for total number of 200 yards games with 5.

Thomas also tied the NCAA record for the being the fastest to reach 1,000 yards at seven games and was one of only three freshmen ever to rush for over 1,800 yards.

2005-2007 seasons
Thomas's next two seasons were considered "disappointing" based on his performance his freshman year.  Although he has had hamstring problems during his sophomore and junior years, his "sudden free fall is perplexing" to NFL scouts.  In his senior year, he played in 11 games but only carried the ball 116 times.

Fallout from upperclass years
Thomas's performance his sophomore through senior years was considered by NFL Scouts to be less than adequate for the NFL.  Injuries slowed Thomas as he moved deeper into his career and he was "snubbed" by the NFL immediately after his senior year  and was not picked up during the NFL Draft.

References

External links
 North Texas Mean Green Sports

1985 births
Living people
People from Longview, Texas
American football running backs
North Texas Mean Green football players
Oklahoma Defenders players